Nordnæs Bataillon is a buekorps in Bergen that was established 3 May 1858. The members primarily come from the eastern side of Nordnes.

References

External links

Buekorps
Organizations established in 1858
1858 establishments in Norway